Ivory is a commune in the Jura department in Bourgogne-Franche-Comté in eastern France.

Population

Old tree
In a farmyard in the village is a huge old lime tree.  Now old and hollow, the trunk could accommodate a table for six or eight diners.  It is said to have been planted to mark the marriage of Maria, nineteen-year-old daughter and heiress of Charles the Bold, Duke of Burgundy, to Emperor Maximilian I.  The marriage took place on 18 August 1477.  Maria's father had died in battle outside Nancy on 5 January that same year.
Why plant a tree in Ivory? Who planted it? It was completely unmarked and unknown until a passing visitor told the local Tourist Board the story and the tree was ring fenced and its history recorded on a plaque.

See also
Communes of the Jura department

References

Communes of Jura (department)